Mohammed Ameur ( – born 1959, Debdou) is a Moroccan politician of the Socialist Union of Popular Forces. Between 2007 and 2012, he held the position of "Minister-Delegate for the Moroccans Living Abroad" in the cabinet of Abbas El Fassi. He currently serves as the ambassador to Belgium.

See also
Cabinet of Morocco

References

1959 births
Living people
People from Oujda
Sidi Mohamed Ben Abdellah University alumni
University of Toulouse-Jean Jaurès alumni
Moroccan civil servants
Government ministers of Morocco
Ambassadors of Morocco
Ambassadors of Morocco to Belgium